Andy Murray was the defending champion but decided not to participate.
Richard Gasquet won the title beating Gilles Simon in an all-French final, 6–2, 6–1.

Seeds

Draw

Finals

Top half

Bottom half

Qualifying

Seeds

Qualifiers

Draw

First qualifier

Second qualifier

Third qualifier

Fourth qualifier

References
 Main Draw
 Qualifying Draw

Singles
PTT Thailand Open - Singles
 in Thai tennis